Various Early Christian writers wrote gospels and other books, some of which were canonized as the New Testament canon developed. The Apostolic Fathers were prominent writers who are traditionally understood to have met and learned from Jesus' personal disciples. The Church Fathers are later writers with no direct connection to the disciples (other than the claim to apostolic succession). Early Christian apologists tried to defend Christianity against its critics, especially the Ancient Greek and Roman philosophers. Dates given, if not otherwise specified, are of their writings or bishopric, not of their lives.

Paul of Tarsus, "Apostle to the Gentiles", earliest New Testament author 45~65
Four Evangelists, traditionally identified as the authors of the canonical gospels 60~125
Ignatius, bishop of Antioch, apostolic father 68~107
Marcion of Sinope, evangelist and theologian, founder of Marcionism, published the first known canon of the New Testament, 85~160
Clement of Rome, bishop of Rome, apostolic father 88~101
Papias, bishop of Hierapolis, apostolic father 110~130
Polycarp of Smyrna, bishop of Smyrna, apostolic father 110~160
Justin Martyr, church father ~165
Melito of Sardis, bishop of Sardis, ~180
Irenaeus, bishop of Lyon, disciple of Polycarp, apologist 180~202
Origen of Alexandria, 185~254, Neoplatonist, controversial during his lifetime, posthumously condemned at the Second Council of Constantinople in 553
Tatian, pupil of Justin Martyr, ascetic theologian ~185
Athenagoras of Athens, philosopher, apologist ~190
Polycrates, bishop of Ephesus, excommunicated by Victor I of Rome over the Easter controversy ~196
Montanus, self-proclaimed prophet and founder of Montanism, last quarter of 2nd century CE
Tertullian, church father, apologist, first Christian writer in Latin, later a Montanist 197~230
Hippolytus, church father, sometimes termed the first Antipope, reconciled with the church and died a martyr 217~236
Cyprian, bishop of Carthage, martyr 218~258
Clement of Alexandria, church father, Bishop of Alexandria ~220
Novatian, a rigorist and Antipope in 251
Dionysius, patriarch of Alexandria, pope of the Coptic Orthodox Church 248~264
Paul of Samosata, bishop of Antioch, adoptionist, condemned at 269 Council of Antioch
Athanasius of Alexandria, c. 297~373, patriarch of Alexandria, defender of the Trinitarian doctrine
Donatus Magnus, bishop of Carthage, (+355), leader of the Donatists from 313
Lactantius, apologist ~317
Arnobius, apologist ~330
Eusebius, wrote History of the Church ~325
Augustine of Hippo, 354-430, Latin church father, wrote Confessions and City of God

See also
 List of Church Fathers
 New Testament apocrypha

References 

Ancient Christian texts
 
Writers
Writers, early
Early Christian